The Hmong Archives, formerly known as Hmong Nationality Archives, is a nonprofit organization located in Saint Paul, Minnesota, United States with the mission to research, collect, preserve, interpret, and disseminate materials in all formats about or by Hmong.

The Hmong Archives was founded by Marlin LeRoy Heise (Minnesota Historical Society retiree), Yuepheng Xiong (founder of Hmong ABC), Tzianeng Vang (founder of Hmong Professional Network) and other Hmong professionals in February 1999. It was first housed at Metropolitan State University in Saint Paul. It later relocated to a Hmong business strip in the "Minnehaha Mall", the Hmong Archives then found its way to the Center of Hmong Studies at Concordia University, Saint Paul. Overcrowding led the organization in May 2008 to 298½ University Avenue West, Saint Paul, MN, above the Hmong ABC (Arts, Books & Crafts) store.  Since early 2012 Hmong Archives had relocated to 343 Michigan Street, Saint Paul, MN. Regular office hours are Monday, Wednesday, and Friday from 10AM to 6PM.

Collections range from rare Hmong record albums to Hmong embroidery, Hmong children's drawings, videos and books in over a dozen languages.  As of March 2013, over 150,000 items had been accessioned.

Current staff are volunteers.

External links
Official website

Hmong-American culture in Minneapolis–Saint Paul
Hmong-American culture and history
Non-profit organizations based in Minnesota
Organizations established in 1999
1999 establishments in Minnesota